Taj Sultanpur  is a village in the southern state of Karnataka, India. It is located in the Gulbarga taluk of Kalaburagi district in Karnataka, Gulbarga also being the nearest town.

Demographics
 India census, Taj Sultanpur had a population of 7005 with 3500 males and 3505 females.

See also
 Gulbarga
 Districts of Karnataka

References

External links
 http://Gulbarga.nic.in/

Villages in Kalaburagi district